Suskənd (also, Süskən, Suskend, and Syusgen) is a village and municipality in the Qakh Rayon of Azerbaijan.  It has a population of 211.

References 

Populated places in Qakh District